Pseudorthocerataceae is an extinct superfamily of actively mobile carnivorous cephalopod, essentially a Nautiloid, that lived in what would be North America, Europe, Australia, and Asia during the Ordovician from 490—445.6 mya, existing for approximately .

Taxonomy
Pseudorthocerataceae was named by Sweet (1964). It was assigned to Pseudorthocerida by Barskov (1968); and to Orthocerida by Sweet (1964), Evans (1994) and Evans (1994).

Morphology
The shell is usually long, and may be straight ("orthoconic") or gently curved.  In life, these animals may have been similar to the modern squid, except for the long shell.

Fossil distribution
Fossil distribution is exclusive to Sardinia, Wisconsin USA, and northern Ontario, Canada.

References

Prehistoric nautiloids
Ordovician cephalopods
Late Ordovician extinctions
Paleozoic cephalopods of Asia
Paleozoic cephalopods of Europe
Paleozoic cephalopods of North America
Paleozoic animals of Oceania